Megan Angelo (born ca. 1985) is a journalist and the author of the 2020 novel Followers.

Early life and education 
Angelo grew up in Quakertown, Pennsylvania, and has two younger brothers. She attended St. Isidore Elementary School and Quakertown High School. She graduated from Villanova University in 2006.

Career 
Angelo has written articles about pop culture and parenting, for outlets including Glamour, the New York Times, the Wall Street Journal, Slate, and Elle.

Followers 
Angelo's novel Followers was released in hardcover by HarperCollins on January 14, 2020. It was released in paperback later that year.

Bethanne Patrick, writing for the Washington Post, called Followers "terrific writing about terrifying ideas." Kirkus Reviews gave it a starred review and noted, "Endless clever details and suspenseful plotting make this speculative-fiction debut an addictive treat." Leah Donnella, of NPR, named it one of the best realistic fiction books of 2020.

References 

Living people
1980s births
Year of birth uncertain
21st-century American women writers

American women journalists
American women novelists
Journalists from Pennsylvania
Novelists from Pennsylvania
People from Quakertown, Pennsylvania
Villanova University alumni
21st-century American journalists
21st-century American novelists